Giovanni Antonio Galignani (1757–1821) was an Italian newspaper publisher born at Brescia.

After living some time in London, he moved to Paris, where in 1800 he started an English library, and in 1808 a monthly publication, the Repertory of English Literature. In 1814 he began to publish the Galignani's Messenger, a daily paper printed in English.

After his death in 1821, his two sons, John Anthony (1796–1873) and William (1798–1882) continued publishing the paper. Under their management it enjoyed a high reputation for its global coverage and emphasis on progressive news. Its stated policy was to promote goodwill between England and France. The brothers' goodwill was not simply rhetoric. They expanded their prestige by establishing and endowing hospitals at Corbeil and at Neuilly-sur-Seine. In recognition of their generosity, the city of Corbeil erected a monument in their honour.

In 1884 the Galignani family disposed of their interest in Galignani's Messenger. Since then until it was finally discontinued in 1904, the paper appeared under the title of the Daily Messenger.

Galignani's Messenger is referred to in Turgenev's novel Fathers and Sons.
Also mentioned in George du Maurier's "Trilby". It is also mentioned in the Diary of Maria Bashkirtseff.
It is also visited by the main character of J.K. Huysmans' novel À rebours.

There are also references to 'Galignani's' in Trollope's Last Chronicle Of Barset, Thackeray's Vanity Fair and Stevenson’s and Osbourne’s The Wrong Box.

Notes

References
 Twenty-four lectures on the Italian language delivered at the Lyceum of Arts, Sciences, and Languages; ... By Mr. Galignani. London: printed for the author, and sold by Messrs. B. and J. White; Mr. Edwards; Messrs. Hookham and Carpenter; Mr. Emsley; Mr. Longman; Mr. Cawthorne; Mr. Heptinstall; and by the author, 1796.
 Twenty-four lectures on the Italian language by Mr. Galignani. In this second edition, the work is enlarged one third, by numberless additions and improvements by the editor, Antonio Montucci. Edinburgh: printed by C. Stewart, ... for T. Boosey, ... London., 1806.
 Italian extracts, being an extensive selection from the best classic & modern Italian authors preceded by a copious vocabulary with familiar phrases and dialogues by the editor, Antonio Montucci (2nd. ed.). 	London: Boosey, 1818
 Traveller's guide through Italy. Paris: 1819.
 Traveller's guide through France. Paris: 1819.

Sources
 Barber, Giles: "Galignani's and the Publication of English Books in France from 1800 to 1852", Library s5-XVI (1961), p. 267–286 
 

1757 births
1821 deaths
19th-century French newspaper publishers (people)
Italian newspaper publishers (people)
Giovanni Antonio